József Fitos (4 November 1959 – 23 December 2022) was a Hungarian professional footballer who played as a midfielder. He was a member of the Hungary national team. Fitos worked as an active football coach.

Club career 
Fitos started playing football in 1971 for Lenti. In 1978 he transferred to Zalaegerszegi TE. From 1980 to 1985 he played for Szombathelyi Haladás. He then moved to Budepest Honvéd, the success team of the 1980s, where he won three champion titles with the team. In 1989 he signed to Panathinaikos and then for Panionios In 1990 he returned home and played for Újpest. He then played for Hargita FC, where he finished his active sports career.

International career 
Between 1985 and 1989 Fitos played 12 times for the Hungary national team.

Coaching career 
From 2002 Fitos was a coach at the Hungarian football teams Budapest Honvéd, FC Ózdi, LSE Széfi-Fi and ASR Gázgyár, and since 2017 he has been the football coach of Leányfalu SE.

Personal life and death 
On 17 February 2017, the Budapest District Court sentenced him to one year and six months imprisonment on two counts of fraud. The execution of the sentence was suspended for three years.

Fitos died on 23 December 2022, at the age of 63.

Honours 
Budapest Honvéd
 Nemzeti Bajnokság I: 1985–86, 1987–88, 1988–89
 Magyar Kupa finalist: 1988

References 

1959 births
2022 deaths
People from Lenti
Hungarian footballers
Association football midfielders
Hungary international footballers
Nemzeti Bajnokság I players
Zalaegerszegi TE players
Szombathelyi Haladás footballers
Budapest Honvéd FC players
Panathinaikos F.C. players
Panionios F.C. players
Újpest FC players
Hungarian football managers
Budapest Honvéd FC managers
Hungarian expatriate footballers
Hungarian expatriate sportspeople in Greece
Expatriate footballers in Greece